Jakabszállás is a  village in Bács-Kiskun county, in the Southern Great Plain region of Hungary.

Geography

It has an airport, Jakabszállás Airport , with tarmac and grass runways. It is home to Genevation Aircraft.

Populated places in Bács-Kiskun County